National Security Act may refer to:
National Security Act (India), law to provide for preventive detention
National Security Act (South Korea), regarding seditious activities
National Security Act of 1947, a United States law that established the Central Intelligence Agency
National Security Act 2017 (Canada)

See also
National Security Law (disambiguation)
 NSA (disambiguation)